Bilstone is a small village and former civil parish, now in the parish of Shackerstone, in the Hinckley and Bosworth district of Leicestershire, England. In 1931 the parish had a population of 68.

The village's name means 'farm/settlement of Bildr' or 'farm/settlement on a corner or angle'.

A half mile to the south, on Gibbet Lane, was a gibbet post. It dated from 1800, but had disappeared by 1988. The post was close to a contemporary murder. At the west of the village is a Grade II listed early 19th-century  farmhouse. At the north of the village on Mill Lane is a disused 18th-century watermill, with adjoined 19th-century buildings. The mill was operational in the 1950s; today its machinery doesn't exist.

Bilstone is listed in the Domesday Book as in the Guthlaxton Hundred of Leicestershire, with two ploughlands, three households and three freemen. In 1066 Countess Godiva was Lord, she remaining as such in 1086, also becoming Tenant-in-chief to William I.

In 1870-1872 Bilston was a township in the parish of Norton Juxta Twycross with a population of 116 and 25 houses.

In 1866 Bilstone became a parish in its own right, on 1 April 1935 the parish was abolished and merged with Shackerstone.

John Grundy, Sr., land surveyor and civil engineer, was born in Bilstone c. 1696.

References

External links

“Bilstone”, Genuki

Villages in Leicestershire
Former civil parishes in Leicestershire
Shackerstone